Kennedy Kwasi Kankam is a Ghanaian politician and member of the Seventh Parliament of the Fourth Republic of Ghana representing the Nhyiaeso Constituency in the Ashanti Region on the ticket of the New Patriotic Party. He is currently the municipal chief executive for Asokore Mampong Municipal Assembly.

Early life and education 
Kankam was born on 22 January 1978 and hails from Adiebeba in the Ashanti Region of Ghana. He had his basic education at Nhyiaeso International School in Kumasi from July 1982 to July 1994. He further attended Prempeh College from September 1995 to November 1997. He later went to Christian Service University College where he graduated with a bachelor's degree in administration from 2009 to 2013. He later went to KNUST for his master's degree in accounting from 2014 to 2016. He further went to Oxford University for his diploma in effective writing in September 2017.

Career 
Kankam was the managing director for Kekka Company Limited since 2005. He was the deputy administrative manager for Metro Mass Transit Limited from 2002 to 2004. He was the marketing manager for Nick and Cilogar Investment Limited. He is the current captain of the Kumasi Royal Golf Club.

Politics 
Kankam is a member of the New Patriotic Party and the former member of parliament for Nhyiaeso Constituency. In June 2020, he lost his parliamentary seat to Stephen Amoah during the NPP's parliamentary primaries. He was nominated by Nana Akufo-Addo and currently the Municipal Chief Executive of the Asokore Mampong Municipality in the Ashanti Region.

Committees 
Kankam was a member of the Public Accounts Committee and also a member of the Environment, Science and Technology Committee.

Personal life 
Kankam is a Christian. He is married. He enjoys playing golf and watching football.

Controversy 
In June 2021, Kankam was directed by the Auditor-General to recover an amount of about 500,000 Ghana cedis which he gave to over 300 people in the Nhyiaeso Constituency. It was alleged the amount went out as a loan but no recoveries were made.

Philanthropy 
In August 2019, Kankam donated a 33-seater bus and also rented an office for the NPP branch in his constituency.

References

Ghanaian MPs 2017–2021
1978 births
Living people
Ghanaian Pentecostals
New Patriotic Party politicians